Tin Jedvaj (born 28 November 1995) is a Croatian professional footballer who plays as a defender for Emirati club Al Ain on loan from Russian Premier League club Lokomotiv Moscow. He was a part of the Croatia national team's squad which ended runners-up to France in 2018 FIFA World Cup. He is mostly deployed as a centre back and occasionally as a right back.

Club career

Dinamo Zagreb
Jedvaj started his professional career in 2013 with Dinamo Zagreb, coming through Dinamo's youth academy. He made his debut in a match against Osijek, playing in central defence alongside Josip Šimunić. He scored his debut goal against Cibalia.

During his first professional season with the club, he won the Croatian Prva HNL trophy. At the beginning of the new season, he won another trophy with the club when Dinamo defeated Hajduk Split in the Croatian Supercup. During his time with Dinamo, Jedvaj made total of 14 official appearances for the club.

Roma
At the end of his first professional season, Jedvaj was targeted and approached by Italian club Roma, although the initial offer was rejected by the Dinamo board. On 10 July 2013, however, it was confirmed that Jedvaj had signed a contract with the Roman club. Jedvaj made his Roma debut on 1 December 2013, coming on as an 83rd-minute substitute in a 4–0 Serie A victory over Genoa. He made his starting debut for the club against the same opposition in the last round of the Serie A season, with Genoa winning the clash 1–0 at the Stadio Luigi Ferraris. Those were Jedvaj's only two appearances for the season, appearing on the bench 33 times for Roma in the 2013–14 season.

Bayer Leverkusen
On 11 June 2014, Bayer Leverkusen announced that they had reached an agreement with all parties for a loan agreement with Roma and Jedvaj, allowing Jedvaj to join Bayer on loan until the end of the 2015–16 season.
Jedvaj's debut with the Germans – where he contributed significantly while playing all 90 minutes in the first official match of the season – helped the team to a 6–0 victory against Alemannia Waldalgesheim in the first round of the 2014–15 DFB-Pokal. Just a few days later, on 19 August, Jedvaj made his debut with the Germans in the UEFA Champions League, replacing teammate Giulio Donati in the 46th minute in Bayer's 3–2 away victory in Denmark over Copenhagen in the 2014–15 UEFA Champions League play-off round. Jedvaj played the second half well, helping his team to secure an eventual victory. He did, however, receive a yellow card in the 51st minute of the match. Jedvaj also played in the return match against Copenhagen in the Germans' 4–0 victory, allowing Bayer qualification to the Champions League group stage. Jedvaj played all 90 minutes of the match, even earning a penalty on the half-hour mark of which striker Stefan Kießling converted in an eventual 3–0 victory.

Jedvaj subsequently made his debut in the Bundesliga on 23 August, a 2–0 victory over Borussia Dortmund in the first match of the campaign. He scored his first goal with Bayer early on in the second game of the season, a 4–2 home win against Hertha BSC. Jedvaj scored in the 50th minute, tying the game 1–1 before Bayer eventually went on to win. Jedvaj continued his fine form at Leverkusen by scoring a powerful curving goal against Werder Bremen to give his side a 1–0 lead. He later assisted Son Heung-min for the goal that would tie the game for a final result of 3–3.

On 20 January 2015, Bayer Leverkusen confirmed that they had signed Jedvaj from Roma on a permanent deal and signed a contract with the Croatian defender until 2020. However, Jedvaj was only able to make one appearance in the first half of the 2015–16 season. This was due to a thigh injury that recurred three times. His only appearance came against Hamburger SV in October, where he came on as a substitute. On 29 October 2016, he scored the winning goal in a 2–1 victory against VfL Wolfsburg.

On 20 August 2019, Jedvaj was loaned out to FC Augsburg until the end of 2019–20 season. On 17 December, he scored the second goal in a 3–0 victory over Fortuna Düsseldorf. On 16 May 2020, he scored the only goal in a 2–1 defeat to VfL Wolfsburg. Upon return to Leverkusen in summer 2020, Jedvaj was completely sidelined by coach Peter Bosz, playing only in the Europa League.

Lokomotiv Moscow
On 24 July 2021, Jedvaj signed a four-year-long deal with Russian Premier League club Lokomotiv Moscow. He was brought in to replace his compatriot Vedran Ćorluka, who retired from football two months earlier. He made his debut on 6 August as a 46th-minute substitute in the 1–1 league draw with Ufa. He scored his first goal for Lokomotiv on 25 October in a 2–1 victory over Sochi.

Loan to Al Ain
On 20 December 2022, Jedvaj moved on loan to Al Ain in the United Arab Emirates until 30 June 2023, with an option to buy.

International career

Jedvaj has represented Croatia at various youth levels. He made his senior debut at age 18, playing the final 13 minutes in a friendly match against Cyprus on 4 September 2014 at Stadion Aldo Drosina in Pula. On 31 May 2016, he was confirmed to be a part of the Croatia squad for UEFA Euro 2016. He was selected to start a match against Spain, which Croatia won 2–1.

In May 2018, he was named in Croatia's preliminary 32-man squad for the 2018 FIFA World Cup in Russia. He featured once during the tournament, playing the whole ninety minutes of a 2–1 victory over Iceland. Croatia finished the tournament as runners-up to France. On 16 November 2018, he scored two goals in a UEFA Nations League group match against Spain, including the winner in a 3–2 victory.

During Euro 2020 qualifying, Jedvaj played regularly, replacing injured right back Šime Vrsaljko and appearing in five out of eight games. However, ahead of Nations League matches against Sweden and Portugal, Jedvaj was dropped from the national team.

Personal life
Jedvaj's father Zdenko is a former footballer. During the Bosnian War, his family left Mostar, Bosnia and Herzegovina, and moved to the Croatian capital of Zagreb. In June 2022, Jedvaj married his long-time girlfriend Dina Dragija in Varaždin.

In May 2020, Jedvaj appeared in the music video for the song "Poziv" (Call) by Serbian rapper Cvija.

Career statistics

Club

International

Scores and results list Croatia's goal tally first, score column indicates score after each Jedvaj goal

Honours
Dinamo Zagreb
Prva HNL: 2012–13
Croatian Supercup: 2013

Croatia
FIFA World Cup runner-up: 2018

Individual
Croatian Football Hope of the Year: 2014

Orders
Order of Duke Branimir: 2018

References

External links

1995 births
Footballers from Zagreb
Living people
Croatian footballers
Croatia youth international footballers
Croatia under-21 international footballers
Croatia international footballers
Association football defenders
GNK Dinamo Zagreb players
A.S. Roma players
Bayer 04 Leverkusen players
FC Augsburg players
FC Lokomotiv Moscow players
Al Ain FC players
Croatian Football League players
Serie A players
Bundesliga players
Russian Premier League players
UEFA Euro 2016 players
2018 FIFA World Cup players
Croatian expatriate footballers
Expatriate footballers in Italy
Croatian expatriate sportspeople in Italy
Expatriate footballers in Germany
Croatian expatriate sportspeople in Germany
Expatriate footballers in Russia
Croatian expatriate sportspeople in Russia
Expatriate footballers in the United Arab Emirates
Croatian expatriate sportspeople in the United Arab Emirates